The 2016–17 Portland State Vikings men's basketball team represented Portland State University during the 2016–17 NCAA Division I men's basketball season. The Vikings, led by eighth-year head coach Tyler Geving, played their home games at the Peter Stott Center as members of the Big Sky Conference. They finished the season 15–16, 7–11 in Big Sky play to finish in a tie for eighth place. As the No. 8 seed in the Big Sky tournament, they defeated Northern Arizona in the first round before losing to top-seeded North Dakota in the quarterfinals.

On March 16, 2017, the Vikings announced that they had parted ways with head coach Tyler Geving after 8 seasons. The school then hired Santa Clara associate head coach and ex-Portland State assistant Barret Peery as the new head coach on April 10.

Previous season
The Vikings finished the 2015–16 season 13–18, 8–10 in Big Sky play to finish in eighth place. They defeated Northern Colorado in the first round of the Big Sky tournament to advance to the Quarterfinals where they lost to Weber State.

Departures

Incoming Transfers

2016 incoming recruits

Roster

Schedule and results

|-
!colspan=9 style=| Exhibition

|-
!colspan=9 style=| Non-conference regular season

|-
!colspan=9 style=| Big Sky regular season

|-
!colspan=9 style=| Big Sky tournament

See also
2016–17 Portland State Vikings women's basketball team

References

Portland State Vikings men's basketball seasons
Portland State
Portland State Vikings men's basketball
Portland State Vikings men's basketball
Port
Port